William A. Tym is an American former tennis player.

Tennis career
Tym, raised in Montville, New Jersey, attended Boonton High School and played collegiate tennis for the University of Florida. In 1963 he was SEC champion at No. 1 singles and earned All-American honors, reaching the quarter-finals of the NCAA singles championships. During the 1960s he featured in the six editions of the US Open and played in doubles main draws at Wimbledon. From 1987 to 1996 he served as the men's head coach of Vanderbilt University. He was the personal coach of tennis player Bryan Shelton.

Personal life
Tym is married to former collegiate tennis coach Alice Luthy.

References

External links
 
 

Year of birth missing (living people)
Living people
American male tennis players
Boonton High School alumni
People from Montville, New Jersey
Sportspeople from Morris County, New Jersey
Tennis people from New Jersey
Florida Gators men's tennis players
Vanderbilt Commodores men's tennis coaches
American tennis coaches